4-Methylamphetamine (4-MA; PAL-313; Aptrol; p-TAP) is a stimulant and anorectic drug of the phenethylamine and amphetamine chemical classes.

In vitro, it acts as a potent and balanced serotonin, norepinephrine, and dopamine releasing agent with Ki affinity values of 53.4nM, 22.2nM, and 44.1nM at the serotonin, norepinephrine, and dopamine transporters, respectively.  However, more recent in vivo studies that involved performing microdialysis on rats showed a different trend. These studies showed that 4-methylamphetamine is much more potent at elevating serotonin (~18 x baseline) relative to dopamine (~5 x baseline). The authors speculated that this is because 5-HT release dampens DA release through some mechanism. For example, it was suggested that a possible cause for this could be activation of 5HT2C receptors since this is known to inhibit DA release. In addition there are alternative explanations such as 5-HT release then going on to encourage GABA release, which has an inhibitory effect on DA neurons.

4-MA was investigated as an appetite suppressant in 1952 and was even given a trade name, Aptrol, but development was apparently never completed. More recently it has been reported as a novel designer drug.

In animal studies, 4-MA was shown to have the lowest rate of self-administration out of a range of similar drugs tested (the others being 3-methylamphetamine, 4-fluoroamphetamine, and 3-fluoroamphetamine), likely as a result of having the highest potency for releasing serotonin relative to dopamine.

More than a dozen deaths were reported throughout Europe in 2012-2013 after consumption of amphetamine ('speed') contaminated with 4-methylamphetamine.

See also 
 1-(4-Methylphenyl)-2-aminobutane
 2-Methylamphetamine
 3-Methylamphetamine
 4-Methyl-N-methylamphetamine
 4-Methyl-N-methylcathinone
 4-Methylphenmetrazine
 3-Methoxy-4-methylamphetamine
 3,4-Dimethylamphetamine
 4-Ethylamphetamine

References 

Substituted amphetamines
Anorectics
Serotonin-norepinephrine-dopamine releasing agents
Stimulants